The lords of Wallingford Castle controlled the medieval castle of Wallingford during the medieval and early-modern period.

List of lord of Wallingford Castle
Miles Crispin; 
Maud Crispin; 
Brien FitzCount; 
Nigel D'Oyly;
Walter de Coutances;
Eleanor of Aquitaine; 
Hubert de Burgh, 1st Earl of Kent; 
Richard Fitz Roy;  
Ranulph de Blondeville, 4th Earl of Chester; 
Richard, 1st Earl of Cornwall; 
Simon de Montfort, 6th Earl of Leicester; 
Edmund, 2nd Earl of Cornwall; 
Piers Gaveston; 
Hugh the younger Despenser; 
Isabella of France; 
Roger Mortimer, 1st Earl of March; 
John of Eltham, Earl of Cornwall;
Sir John Stonor; 
Edward, the Black Prince; 
Aubrey de Vere, 10th Earl of Oxford; 
John Beaufort, 1st Earl of Somerset; 
William le Scrope, 1st Earl of Wiltshire; 
Henry IV of England; 
Thomas Chaucer; 
William de la Pole, 1st Duke of Suffolk; 
Alice de la Pole; 
John de la Pole, 2nd Duke of Suffolk; 
Richard Grey; 
Francis Lovell, Viscount Lovell; 
Arthur, Prince of Wales; 
Sir Henry Norreys; 
Francis Knollys (the elder); 
William Knollys, 1st Earl of Banbury;
Thomas Blagge; 
Edmund Dunch, Baron Burnell of East Wittenham;
Thomas Howard, 1st Earl of Berkshire.

Bibliography
 Hedges, J.K. (1881) The History of Wallingford, in the County of Berks. Wm Clowes, London, 2 vol.

External links
Wallingford History Gateway
Royal Berkshire History: Wallingford Castle

Wallingford Castle, Lords
Lords of Wallingford Castle
Lists of office-holders in England